Florida A&M University Developmental Research School (FAMU-DRS) is a K-12 laboratory school in Tallahassee, Florida, affiliated with Florida A&M University.

It was established in 1887 with elementary grades, before expanding to junior high school at a later point. Its original location was a temporary facility at 424 Osceola Street. In its history it was known as the Demonstration Elementary School and The Model School. It was named the Lucy Moten Elementary at Florida A&M University in 1932. Its name changed from a "laboratory school" to the current one around the time the Sidney Martin Developmental Research School Act of 1991 passed.

Notable alumni
 Otto Brown, former NFL player
 Ron Dugans, former NFL player
 Earl Holmes, former NFL player
 Taylor Jacobs, former NFL player
 Sam Madison, Assistant coach for the Kansas City Chiefs and former NFL player
 Jazmine Jones, current WNBA player
Chris Jackson, current NFL player

References

External links
 Florida A&M University Developmental Research School

Florida A&M University
High schools in Leon County, Florida
Schools in Tallahassee, Florida
1877 establishments in Florida
Educational institutions established in 1877
Laboratory schools in the United States
Historically segregated African-American schools in Florida
Buildings and structures in Tallahassee, Florida
Public K-12 schools in Florida